Euclides Pereira (born 7 May 1941) is a former Vale Tudo fighter and current Brazilian jiu-jitsu coach.

Biography
Pereira was born in northeastern Brazil. His family moved to the city of Natal when he was a child, and he attended Salesian College to become a priest. He ended leaving the college for working in a hotel, and he would start training in martial arts, soon become a student under José Jurandir Moura, who was also a judo and Brazilian jiu-jitsu certified teacher under George Gracie and Takeo Yano. He also trained in karate, capoeira and boxing, and had his debut in the Vale Tudo circuit at 17.

He joined the luta livre camp and became a legend in the vale tudo fights, getting the nickname of "O Diabo Louro" ("The Blond Devil") for his aggressiveness and charisma. He was the star of the Brazilian TV show Heroes do Ringue, fighting weekly from 1960-1966 on TV. Lore had his record as 358-0, even although Euclides was known not to hand pick his opponents in order to pad his record. He fought fellow Vale Tudo legends like Ivan Gomes and Valdemar Santana. He also was made famous when he defeated Carlson Gracie via a decision in 1968.

The fight which took 5 years to be planned, until all the conditions imposed by the Gracies were finally accepted. Knowing Carlson's danger on the mat, Euclides took advantage of his own superiority in striking and wrestling and almost got Gracie knocked out at the fourth round, breaking his nose and damaging his eye region. After 50 minutes, Pereira won the decision over a heavily bloodied Carlson. The match had controversy when Carlson claimed he had been "robbed" by the judges, given that Euclides had exited the ring to avoid a guillotine choke, however a common tactic at the time. Carlson was granted a rematch, but he never took it. Euclides would fight for 25 years before retiring.

Career highlights
1958: Won over Waldo Santana by submission (strikes) in Recife
1963: Won over King Kong by KO (strikes)
1963: Drew with Waldemar Santana
1964: Drew with Ivan Gomes in Recife
1967: Won over Waldemar Santana by decision
1967: Won over Waldemar Santana by decision
1967: Drew with Ivan Gomes in Campina Grande
1967: Drew with Ivan Gomes in Petrolina - The match was called out by officials when sun set over the open air ring and it was considered insufficient light.
1968: Won over Waldemar Santana by retirement - Santana refused to return to the ring.
1968: Won over Carlson Gracie by decision
1972: Drew with Ivan Gomes in Manaus
1974: Won over Waldemar Santana by decision
1974: Drew with Ivan Gomes in Brasilia
1979: Won over Rei Zulu by submission (guillotine choke)

References

Brazilian male mixed martial artists
Mixed martial artists utilizing capoeira
Mixed martial artists utilizing karate
Mixed martial artists utilizing catch wrestling
Mixed martial artists utilizing Luta Livre
Mixed martial artists utilizing vale tudo
Mixed martial artists utilizing boxing
Mixed martial artists utilizing Brazilian jiu-jitsu
Brazilian capoeira practitioners
Brazilian practitioners of Brazilian jiu-jitsu
People awarded a red belt in Brazilian jiu-jitsu
Brazilian catch wrestlers
Living people
1941 births